Paul Methuen may refer to:

 Paul Methuen (reformer) (fl. 1566), Scottish reformer
 Sir Paul Methuen (diplomat) (c. 1672–1757), British diplomat, Secretary of State, Privy Councillor, MP for Devizes 1708–1710, Brackley 1715–1747
 Paul Methuen (MP) (1723–1795), MP for Westbury 1747–1748, for Warwick 1762–1768, Great Bedwyn 1774–1781
 Paul Cobb Methuen (1752–1816), MP for Great Bedwyn 1781–1784
 Paul Methuen, 1st Baron Methuen (1779–1849), British politician, MP for Wiltshire 1812–1819 and 1832–1837
 Paul Methuen, 3rd Baron Methuen (1845–1932), British military commander and Governor of Natal Colony 1909–1910
 Paul Ayshford Methuen, 4th Baron Methuen (1886–1974), British herpetologist and batrachologist